The 2022–23 Top 14 competition is the 124th French domestic rugby union club competition operated by the Ligue Nationale de Rugby (LNR).

Format 
The top six teams at the end of the regular season (after all the teams played one another twice, once at home, once away) enter a knockout stage to decide the Champions of France. This consists of three rounds: the teams finishing third to sixth in the table play quarter-finals (hosted by the third and fourth placed teams). The winners then face the top two teams in the semi-finals, with the winners meeting in the final at the Stade de France in Saint-Denis. The LNR uses a slightly different bonus points system from that used in most other rugby competitions. It trialled a new system in 2007–08 explicitly designed to prevent a losing team from earning more than one bonus point in a match, a system that also made it impossible for either team to earn a bonus point in a drawn match. LNR chose to continue with this system for subsequent seasons.

France's bonus point system operates as follows:

 4 points for a win.
 2 points for a draw.
 1 bonus point for winning while scoring at least 3 more tries than the opponent. This replaces the standard bonus point for scoring 4 tries regardless of the match result.
 1 bonus point for losing by 5 points (or fewer). The margin had been 7 points until being changed prior to the 2014–15 season.

From the 2017–18 season onwards, only the 14th placed team is automatically relegated to the Pro D2. The 13th placed team play the runner-up of the Pro D2 play-off, with the winner taking up the final place in the Top 14 for the following season.

Teams 

Fourteen clubs will compete in the 2022-23 Top 14 season, 13 of them returning.  Biarritz were relegated to Pro D2 after finishing at the bottom of the table the previous season.  Bayonne is the sole promoted club, finishing second in the Pro D2 the previous season and winning the Pro D2 playoffs.  Perpignan, which finished 13th in the previous Top 14 season, defeated Mont-de-Marsan in the relegation playoffs to retain their place.

Table

Results

See also 
 2022–23 Rugby Pro D2 season

References 
Notes

Citations

 
Top 14 seasons
   
France1